Arenimonas soli is a Gram-negative, aerobic and non-motile bacterium from the genus of Arenimonas which has been isolated from saline-alkaline soil from Hanggin Banner from the Inner Mongolia.

References

External links
Type strain of Arenimonas soli at BacDive -  the Bacterial Diversity Metadatabase

Xanthomonadales
Bacteria described in 2017